Throughout 2006, 133 tropical cyclones formed in seven bodies of water known as tropical cyclone basins. The strongest storms of the year were Typhoon Yagi in the Western Pacific, and Cyclone Glenda of the Australian region. The deadliest and costliest storms of the year were a series of five typhoons that struck the Philippines and China; Chanchu, Bilis, Saomai, Xangsane, and Durian, with most of the damage being caused by Durian of November. So far, 27 Category 3 tropical cyclones formed, including five  Category 5 tropical cyclones in the year.

Tropical cyclones are primarily monitored by a group of ten warning centres, which have been designated as a Regional Specialized Meteorological Center (RSMC) or a Tropical Cyclone Warning Center (TCWC) by the World Meteorological Organization. These are the United States National Hurricane Center (NHC) and Central Pacific Hurricane Center, the Japan Meteorological Agency (JMA), the India Meteorological Department (IMD), Météo-France, Indonesia's Badan Meteorologi, Klimatologi, dan Geofisika, the Australian Bureau of Meteorology (BOM), Papua New Guinea's National Weather Service, the Fiji Meteorological Service (FMS) as well as New Zealand's MetService. Other notable warning centres include the Philippine Atmospheric, Geophysical and Astronomical Services Administration (PAGASA), the United States Joint Typhoon Warning Center (JTWC), and the Brazilian Navy Hydrographic Center.

Global atmospheric and hydrological conditions 

There is a strong El Niño in this year.

Summary 
In the Northern Hemisphere, 10 tropical cyclones have developed or formed in the North Atlantic Ocean basin, 25 in the Eastern and Central Pacific (including one unofficial subtropical cyclone), 40 in the Western Pacific (including three unofficial tropical cyclones), and 12 in the North Indian (including one unofficial deep depression), totaling to 88 official and 6 unofficial tropical cyclones in the Northern Hemisphere, including one official and one unofficial tropical cyclones in the Mediterranean Sea.

In the Southern Hemisphere, 11 tropical cyclones have developed or formed in the South-West Indian Ocean basin, 19 in the South-Central Pacific/Fiji Region, 14 in the South-East Indian/Southwestern Pacific/Australian Region, and including 2 in the South Atlantic/Southeastern Pacific, thus totaling to 46 tropical cyclones in the Southern Hemisphere.

In the whole world combined, 134 tropical cyclones have developed throughout the whole world, including 6 unofficial systems, equaling 140 total tropical cyclones.

Systems

January 
During January 2006, a total of 12 tropical cyclones have developed in tropical cyclone basins. Of those, 7 were named, with 6 of those named systems having tropical storm-equivalent force winds, in ten or three-minute sustained wind speeds. Tropical Storm Zeta from the extremely hyperactive 2005 Atlantic hurricane season became only the second of two tropical storms in the Atlantic to have spanned two different calendar years, with the other being Hurricane Alice of 1954–55. Speaking, Cyclones Tam and Clare were the only tropical cyclones in January 2006 to have known damage totals, even though Boloetse was the most severe and deadliest in the month. Boloetse was also the strongest and most intense tropical cyclone of the month, peaking with 10-minute sustained winds of 100 mph and pressure dropping to 950 hPa/mbar.

February

March

April 
April was relatively inactive in the year that 5 tropical cyclones formed throughout the month. 4 received names. Severe Tropical Cyclone Monica became the first Category 5-equivalent tropical cyclone in 2006, according to the Saffir–Simpson Hurricane Wind Scale (in 1-minute sustained winds). As being the strongest of the year 2006, it was the most intense of the month, peaking at 916 hPa/mbar. Extremely Severe Cyclonic Storm Mala was the strongest of the 2006 North Indian Ocean cyclone season, as well as the most serious. Moderate Tropical Storm/Tropical Cyclone Elia concluded the 2005–06 South-West Indian Ocean cyclone season when it dissipated on April 17. Monica was the last tropical cyclone in the Southern Hemisphere for the first half of 2006 (January–June).

May 
May was super inactive with only two tropical cyclones forming. Both received names. Typhoon Chanchu (Philippine name 'Caloy') was the stronger tropical cyclone of May 2006. Chanchu was the first tropical storm and typhoon of the 2006 Pacific typhoon season, and it was a very deadly and somewhat costly tropical cyclone. Tropical Storm Aletta started the 2006 Pacific hurricane season what it formed as Tropical Depression One-E on May 27.

June 
June was a very inactive month in the year when only four tropical cyclones formed within the northern hemisphere, three of them received names. Tropical Storm Alberto started the 2006 Atlantic hurricane season when it formed on June 10, preceding a below average season later in the year. When Tropical Depression Two-E dissipated on June 5, the 2006 Pacific hurricane season experienced a slightly long lull in activity, not seeing Hurricane Bud form until mid-July. Super Typhoon Ewiniar (Philippine name 'Ester') became the first super typhoon of the 2006 Pacific typhoon season, also causing heavy damage and 150+ fatalities.

July

August

September

October

November

December

Global effects

See also 

 Tropical cyclones by year
 List of earthquakes in 2006
 Tornadoes of 2006

Notes 

1 Only systems that formed either on or after January 1, 2007 are counted in the seasonal totals.
2 Only systems that formed either before or on December 31, 2007 are counted in the seasonal totals.3 The wind speeds for this tropical cyclone/basin are based on the IMD Scale which uses 3-minute sustained winds.
4 The wind speeds for this tropical cyclone/basin are based on the Saffir Simpson Scale which uses 1-minute sustained winds.5The wind speeds for this tropical cyclone are based on Météo-France which uses gust winds.

References

External links 

Regional Specialized Meteorological Centers
 US National Hurricane Center – North Atlantic, Eastern Pacific
 Central Pacific Hurricane Center – Central Pacific
 Japan Meteorological Agency – NW Pacific
 India Meteorological Department – Bay of Bengal and the Arabian Sea
 Météo-France – La Reunion – South Indian Ocean from 30°E to 90°E
 Fiji Meteorological Service – South Pacific west of 160°E, north of 25° S

Tropical Cyclone Warning Centers
 Meteorology, Climatology, and Geophysical Agency of Indonesia – South Indian Ocean from 90°E to 141°E, generally north of 10°S
 Australian Bureau of Meteorology (TCWC's Perth, Darwin & Brisbane) – South Indian Ocean & South Pacific Ocean from 90°E to 160°E, generally south of 10°S
 Papua New Guinea National Weather Service – South Pacific Ocean from 141°E to 160°E, generally north of 10°S
 Meteorological Service of New Zealand Limited – South Pacific west of 160°E, south of 25°S

Tropical cyclones by year
2006 Atlantic hurricane season
2006 Pacific hurricane season
2006 Pacific typhoon season
2006 North Indian Ocean cyclone season
2005–06 Australian region cyclone season
2006–07 Australian region cyclone season
2005–06 South Pacific cyclone season
2006–07 South Pacific cyclone season
2005–06 South-West Indian Ocean cyclone season
2006–07 South-West Indian Ocean cyclone season
2006-related lists